John Magrath may refer to:

 John D. Magrath, American soldier in the U.S. Army
 John Macrory Magrath, chief historian to the O'Briens of Ireland
 John Richard Magrath, British academic and administrator at the University of Oxford
Sir John Magrath, 1st Baronet (d. c. 1652) of the Magrath Baronets
Sir John Magrath, 3rd Baronet (d. c. 1670) of the Magrath Baronets

See also 
 Magrath (disambiguation)
John McGrath (disambiguation)